Damian Cronin (born 17 April 1963 in Wegberg, West Germany) is a former Scotland international rugby union player.

Rugby Union career

Amateur career

He is an alumnus of Campion School, Hornchurch and Prior Park College.

Before the advent of professionalism, Cronin played for Bath and London Scottish. When the Rugby World Cup of 1995 began Cronin was playing for the French club Bourges.

Provincial and professional career

Cronin played for the Anglo-Scots district in the Scottish Inter-District Championship.

When rugby union turned professional, Cronin played for Wasps.

International career

He qualified for Scotland based on his grandparents from Musselburgh.

He was capped by Scotland 'B' against Italy in 1988.

He was capped by Scotland 'A' 8 times between 1990 and 1996.
  
Playing in the second row, he was part of the Grand Slam winning side in 1990. He made his Scotland debut 16 January 1988 against Ireland with his last appearance ten years later against England. In all he won 45 caps and scored 5 tries. He played in the 1991 and 1995 World Cups whilst being a member of London Scottish.

Cronin had a reputation as a prankster. This anecdote from the Glasgow Herald in 1998 is described as the 'crowning moment' of his career:
That occasion was 1995 in Paris when Scotland beat France for the first and only time at the modern Parc des Princes. However, for Cronin the day's highlight came when the crowning moment in his career as a serial prankster arrived at the post-match dinner. Gavin Hastings, buoyant having scored the try which clinched that win, had asked Cronin, then playing in France with Bourges, to help him write his speech so he could make it in French. The direct translation of what was read out does not bear repetition, but suffice to say there was widespread shock among his hosts at the frankness of the Scotland captain's account of how he had spent the hours between the game finishing and getting to the function.

He was also a British and Irish Lion as he went on the 1993 tour to New Zealand.

Business career

He is a Director at Woodstone, a wood and stone floor-fitting company.

References

External links 
Wasps Legends profile
Sporting heroes

1963 births
Living people
Scottish rugby union players
British & Irish Lions rugby union players from Scotland
Scotland international rugby union players
London Scottish F.C. players
People educated at Prior Park College
Scotland 'B' international rugby union players
Bath Rugby players
Wasps RFC players
Scottish Exiles (rugby union) players
Scotland 'A' international rugby union players
Rugby union locks